The Little Firebrand is a 1926 American silent comedy film directed by Charles Hutchison and starring Edith Thornton, George Fawcett and Lou Tellegen.

Cast
 Edith Thornton as Dorothy Jackson 
 George Fawcett as Godfrey Jackson 
 Lou Tellegen as Harley Norcross 
 Eddie Phillips as William 
 Joan Standing as Miss Smyth 
 Lincoln Stedman as Tubby 
 Gino Corrado as Adonis Wenhoff 
 Helen Crawford as Maid 
 Ben Walker as Butler

References

Bibliography
 Munden, Kenneth White. The American Film Institute Catalog of Motion Pictures Produced in the United States, Part 1. University of California Press, 1997.

External links

1926 films
Silent American comedy films
Films directed by Charles Hutchison
American silent feature films
1920s English-language films
Pathé Exchange films
American black-and-white films
1926 comedy films
1920s American films